Hot Heir aka The Great Balloon Chase, is a 1984 3D  comedy film starring  Curtis Credel, Dianne Beatty, Ron Campbell.  It was the second of six 3-D movies produced by Earl Owensby during the 1980s. HOT HEIR (aka The Great Balloon Chase) was shot in Summer/Fall of 1982, and contains stunning stereoscopic photography, especially of the balloons themselves.

The Freedom Weekend Aloft festival was specially created in order to bring together the hot air balloons necessary for filming.  It subsequently became an annual event.

Plot

After the death of his wealthy uncle, and with his inheritance at stake, Heir Pennington (Curtis Credel) becomes involved in a balloon race.

References

External links 
 
 

1984 comedy films
1984 3D films
1984 films
Films directed by Worth Keeter
1980s English-language films